Ruth Law Oliver (May 21, 1887 - December 1, 1970) was a pioneer American aviator during the 1910s.

Biography
She was born Ruth Bancroft Law on May 21, 1887 to Sarah Bancroft Breed and Frederick Henry Law in Lynn, Massachusetts.

She was inspired to take up flying by her brother, parachutist and pioneer movie stuntman Rodman Law (1885–1919), with whom she challenged herself to physically keep up during their childhood.

She was instructed by Harry Atwood and Arch Freeman at Atwood Park in Saugus, Massachusetts, having been refused lessons by Orville Wright because, according to Law, he believed that women weren't mechanically inclined, but this only made her more determined, later saying "The surest way to make me do a thing is to tell me I can't do it." She was an adept mechanic. She received her pilot's license in November 1912, and in 1915 gave a demonstration of aerobatics at Daytona Beach, Florida, before a large crowd. She announced that she was going to "loop the loop" for the first time, and proceeded to do so, not once but twice, to the consternation of her husband, Charles Oliver.

In 1915 she participated in a publicity stunt for baseball's Grapefruit League. Dodgers manager Wilbert Robinson and outfielder Casey Stengel heard that Law had been dropping golf balls from the sky for a nearby golf course and decided that a similar stunt would be good for publicity. On March 13, 1915, Law flew with Stengel on board (though, later, Stengel would recant his role in the tale, saying it was team trainer) ready to drop the baseball to Robinson's waiting mitt. But instead of a baseball, a grapefruit was flung out the plane, either as a prank or by mistake. The fruit shattered on impact, covering Robinson in the "ooze and goo" and making him believe he was injured and covered with blood. Fortunately, this was not the case, but a popular legend is that this incident was how the Grapefruit League earned its nickname.

In the spring of 1916, she took part in an altitude competition, twice narrowly coming in second to male fliers. She was furious, determined to set a record that would stand against men as well as women.

The next day she flew on to New York City. Flying over Manhattan, her fuel cut out, but she glided to a safe landing on Governors Island and was met by United States Army Captain Henry "Hap" Arnold (who changed her spark plugs in the Curtiss pusher), who would one day become Commanding General of the United States Army Air Forces. President Woodrow Wilson attended a dinner held in her honor on 2 December 1916.

After the United States entered World War I in April 1917, she campaigned unsuccessfully for women to be allowed to fly military aircraft. Stung by her rejection, she wrote an article entitled "Let Women Fly!" in the magazine Air Travel, where she argued that success in aviation should prove a woman's fitness for work in that field.

After the war, she continued to set records.

On a morning in 1922, Law woke up to read with surprise an announcement of her retirement in the newspaper; her husband had tired of her dangerous job and had taken that step to end her flying career, and she acquiesced to his demand.

She attributed a 1932 nervous breakdown to the lack of flying, having settled down in Los Angeles, spending her days gardening.

In 1948, Law attended a Smithsonian event in Washington, D.C. celebrating the donation of the Wright brothers' Kitty Hawk plane, despite Orville Wright's earlier refusal to teach her. Notwithstanding her accomplished career in aviation, she traveled by train.

She died on December 1, 1970, in San Francisco. She is buried in Pine Grove Cemetery in Lynn, Massachusetts.

References

Further reading
 Pawlak, Debra Ann. "The Baroness of Flight". Aviation History, July 2008, pp. 16–17.

External links

 Short biography
 Image of Ruth Law in uniform
 Ruth Law at Daytona Beach 1913–1916
 Hill Air Force Base factsheet
  – hosted by LeVar Burton, read by Linda Lavin
 
 Chicago-to-New York flight
 Smithsonian Magazine, 22 March 2017

Members of the Early Birds of Aviation
1970 deaths
1887 births
Aviation pioneers
American aviation record holders
American women aviation record holders
Aviators from Massachusetts
People from Lynn, Massachusetts